The AD&D Masterpiece Collection is a collection of role-playing games for MS-DOS, produced by Mindscape/SSI in 1996.

Contents
The Masterpiece Collection included six of SSI's official AD&D licensed games in one box: Dark Sun: Shattered Lands, Dark Sun: Wake of the Ravager, Ravenloft: Strahd's Possession, Ravenloft: Stone Prophet, Al-Qadim: The Genie's Curse, and Forgotten Realms: Menzoberranzan. The games are all contained on four CD-ROMs, each of which also contains the relevant manuals in Adobe Acrobat format, allowing them to be printed out with exactly the same layout that they had originally.

Reception
Andy Butcher reviewed the Masterpiece Collection for Arcane magazine, rating it a 6 out of 10 overall. He concluded that "six complete PC roleplaying games in one rather impressive box is certainly good value for the money". He noted that an Acrobat viewer is included to read and print the manuals, which allowed SSI to "save on the cost of including six relatively hefty booklets. Of course, if you haven't got access to a printer this isn't going to be very useful, but most of the games are fairly simple to get to grips with, provided you have at least a passing familiarity with the AD&D rules." He only felt that Wake of the Ravager, Stone Prophet, and The Genie's Curse were actually any good, and that the rest "struggle to attain varying degrees of averageness". Despite that, he did conclude that "even three decent (if not quite inspired) computer games for the price of one is still a great bargain - there's enough gameplay in this set to keep you going for several months at least". PC Joker gave the collection a "very good" rating.

References

1996 video games
DOS games
DOS-only games
Dungeons & Dragons video games
Role-playing video games
Single-player video games
Strategic Simulations games
Video game compilations
Video games developed in the United States